Augustus Caesar Buell (September 4, 1847 – May 23, 1904) was an American author who wrote several biographies of great Americans, following the success of a book about his experiences in the Civil War. Most of his material was plagiarized or made up.

Biography
Buell was born in 1847 to Simon and Julia Buell near Norwich, New York.  He was raised in New York City and is known to have enlisted in Company L of the 20th New York Cavalry, on August 21, 1863. He was promoted to corporal three months later, but demoted again the following April, and he left the service in July 1865. He later claimed to have risen to the rank of colonel. For some years he lived in New York State, but his literary career began some time after he had moved to Philadelphia, to work for the major shipbuilding and engineering firm of William Cramp & Sons. In 1876 he was briefly arrested following an accusation of libel. 

In his Civil War memoir, "The Cannoneer", published in 1890, he vividly described his experiences at the Battle of Gettysburg, but that battle took place in July 1863, seven weeks before he enlisted, and two essays by Silas Felton reveal much of the hollow truth behind Buell's claims. He later claimed that a visit to St. Petersburg in Russia on behalf of Cramp's, a few years later, enabled him to find important material for his first biographical project, the life of John Paul Jones. The major demolition job on that work we owe to the far superior scholarship of Admiral Samuel Eliot Morison, who devoted an appendix to Buell's lies about Jones in his own Pulitzer-winning biography. The work of scholars like Morison, which should never have been necessary, reveals the full depth of Buell's fraud. Had he simply introduced false stories without citing any source document, there would have been less of a problem, but he went one step further, and invented entire letters and journals, from which he published extracts in the book.

He died in 1904, and is buried at the Mount Moriah Cemetery in Philadelphia.

Legacy
Milton Hamilton, editor of the papers of colonial administrator Sir William Johnson, had to do the same sort of research as Morison to uncover the truth behind Buell's 1903 production. Two further biographies, of William Penn and Andrew Jackson, were published in the months following Buell's death, by which time suspicions of his work were already growing rapidly. His last posthumous work may be his most truthful, the memoirs of his boss, Charles H. Cramp. About the same time as this was published, Mrs. Reginald de Koven produced the first detailed analysis of the fraudulent Buell technique, specifically his John Paul Jones biography.

Works
"The Cannoneer. Recollections of Service in the Army of the Potomac By 'A Detached Volunteer' in the Regular Artillery", in The National Tribune (Washington, D.C., 1890).
Paul Jones, Founder of the American Navy. A History, New York, C. Scribner’s Sons, 1900, 2 vols.
Sir William Johnson, New York, D. Appleton and Company, 1903.
William Penn as the founder of two commonwealths, New York, D. Appleton and Co., 1904.

"The memoirs of Charles H. Cramp", Philadelphia and London, J.B. Lippincott Co., 1906.
Buell's diary for 1867-68 still survives, in the Davidson Library, University of California, Santa Barbara.

Debunking
De Koven, Mrs R. (an early Jones authority), "A Fictitious Paul Jones Masquerading as the Real", The New York Times (Sunday magazine), 10 June 1906.
Hamilton, Milton W. "Augustus Buell: Fraudulent Historian", Pennsylvania Magazine of History and Biography, 80(4):478-492, Oct. 1956.
Hart, Albert Bushnell, "American Historical Liars", Harper's Magazine, October, 1915, 726-735.
Morison, Samuel E. John Paul Jones: A Sailor's Biography, Boston, Little Brown & Co., 1959.
Felton, Silas. "Pursuing the Elusive 'Cannoneer'", Gettysburg Magazine, issue 9, July 1993.
Felton, Silas. "Postscript to: Pursuing the Elusive 'Cannoneer'", Gettysburg Magazine, issue 19, July 1998.
Bogle, Lori Lyn and Holwitt, Joel L. "The Best Quote Jones Never Wrote", Naval History, April 2004, 18-23.

References

Pseudepigraphy
1904 deaths
1847 births
People from Norwich, New York
Writers from New York (state)
Burials at Mount Moriah Cemetery (Philadelphia)